Virgil I. Grissom Municipal Airport  is a public use airport located three nautical miles (6 km) southeast of the central business district of Bedford, a city in Lawrence County, Indiana, United States.

The airport is named in honor of Virgil I. Grissom (1926-1967), an Indiana native and U.S. Air Force pilot who was one of the original NASA Project Mercury astronauts.

Facilities and aircraft 
It has two asphalt paved runways: 13/31 is 4,501 by 100 feet (1,372 x 30 m) and 6/24 is 3,089 by 70 feet (942 x 21 m).

For the 12-month period ending December 30, 2007, the airport had 5,110 aircraft operations, an average of 14 per day: 93% general aviation, 4% air taxi and 3% military. At that time there were 35 aircraft based at this airport: 97% single-engine and 3% multi-engine.

References

External links 
 Aerial photo from Indiana Department of Transportation
 
 

Airports in Indiana
Transportation buildings and structures in Lawrence County, Indiana